Hot Girl or Hot Girls may refer to:

Film and television
"Hot Girl" (The Office), an episode of the American TV series
Hot Girl, a 2018 short film by Erin Richards

Music
"Hot Girl" (R.I.O. song), 2010
"Hot Girl" (Belly song), 2009
"Hot Girl" (Sabrina song), 1987
"Hot Girls", by Lil' Mo, 2004
"Hot Girl", a song by Megan Thee Stallion from the 2018 album Tina Snow
"Hot Girl", a song by Charli XCX for the 2022 film Bodies Bodies Bodies

See also

Hot Girls, Bad Boys, a 1985 album by Bad Boys Blue
"Hot Girls in Love", a 1983 song by Loverboy
"I Need a Hot Girl", a 1999 single by Hot Boys